The 2010 Pro Bowl was the National Football League's all-star game for the 2009 season. It took place at 8:00 PM EST on Sunday, January 31, 2010, at Sun Life Stadium in Miami Gardens, Florida, the home stadium of the Miami Dolphins and host site of Super Bowl XLIV. The television broadcasters were Mike Tirico, Ron Jaworski and Jon Gruden.

The AFC won the game 41–34.

Site & date changes
The 2010 Pro Bowl was held on the weekend before the Super Bowl, the first time ever that the Pro Bowl was held before the championship game, and the first time that the Pro Bowl was held somewhere other than Aloha Stadium in Honolulu since 1980 (1979 season). NFL Commissioner Roger Goodell said the move was made after looking at alternatives to strengthen the Pro Bowl.

The game was moved up in order to prevent a conflict that would have taken place if the game had taken place on February 13 or 14, with the game facing against the NBA All-Star Game, Winter Olympics, and Daytona 500. Due to the change, players from the conference championship teams, who were going to play in the Super Bowl the following week—the Indianapolis Colts and New Orleans Saints—did not participate. As a result, for the first time in Pro Bowl history, rosters for the AFC and NFC teams were not allowed to include any players from the teams that would be playing in the Super Bowl to avoid major injuries to members of either team. However, these players were still required to be on site for the Pro Bowl to collect a bonus payment from the NFL.

Several NFL players spoke out against the decision regarding timing of the game; ten-time Pro Bowl quarterback Peyton Manning raised issue with the possibility that if the concept of rotating the location of the game were to continue, the 2012 game could be held in a cold-weather city (Indianapolis) not seen as a winter vacation destination. NBC sportscaster Al Michaels was skeptical of the changes, telling the Honolulu Star-Bulletin that "the [NFL] thinks playing it before the Super Bowl will add to the buzz. It won't." Indianapolis Colts president Bill Polian also came out against the change, explaining that it seemed disruptive and "stupid" to have players voted to the Pro Bowl, only to have to sit out because they're playing in the Super Bowl, but still have to show up to the game to collect a bonus payment.

Broadcasting
ESPN aired the game instead of CBS, which aired the 52nd Grammy Awards that evening.

The game was the first Pro Bowl to be legally broadcast on internet radio. As part of a catch in the league's broadcast contracts, the Pro Bowl has, to this point, never been broadcast on the NFL's FieldPass system due to it being broadcast exclusively by Westwood One. The NFL had negotiated internet broadcast rights with all 32 of its teams, but never did so with Westwood One (since it was seen as redundant); since none of the 32 teams actually play in the Pro Bowl, FieldPass did not hold rights. When contracts were renegotiated in 2009, Westwood One's broadcasts were added to FieldPass, and along with it, play-by-play of the Pro Bowl. The Sports USA Radio Network provided the commentary for Westwood One, with SUSA's Larry Kahn on play-by-play and Dan Fouts sharing color commentary with Westwood One's Boomer Esiason.

Scoring summary

AFC roster

Offense

Defense

Special teams

NFC roster

Offense

Defense

Special teams

Notes:
bold denotes player who participated in game
Replacement selection due to injury or vacancy
Injured player; selected but did not play
Replacement starter; selected as reserve
"Need player"; named by coach
Selected but did not play since his team advanced to Super Bowl XLIV
Jackson was selected at both wide receiver and kick returner; he was replaced at kick returner by Percy Harvin
Ben Roethlisberger was the first alternate, but declined due to injury
Carson Palmer was the third alternate, but declined due to injury
Sheldon Brown was the second alternate, but declined citing personal reasons
McKinnie did not play in the Pro Bowl due to unexplained absences from practices
Randy Moss was the first AFC alternate, but did not play citing injury and was replaced.

Number of selections per team

References

External links
 Official Pro Bowl website at NFL.com
 

2010
2009 National Football League season
2010 in American football
2010 in sports in Florida
American football in Florida
January 2010 sports events in the United States
Sports competitions in Miami Gardens, Florida